The 2011–12 season was Tottenham Hotspurs 20th season in the Premier League and 34th successive season in the top division of the English football league system.

The campaign featured Tottenham's 10th appearance in the UEFA Europa League (formerly the UEFA Cup), entering the Play-off Qualifying round due to finishing fifth in the 2010–11 Premier League season. They reached the group stage by defeating Hearts over two legs, but finished third in their group and therefore didn't make the knockout stages of the tournament. The club entered the League Cup in the third round and were defeated by Stoke City on penalties, as well as the FA Cup where they reached the semi-finals but were defeated 5–1 by Chelsea.

Tottenham finished the season in fourth place after occupying third place for the majority of the season. Their last game of the Premier League season was a 2–0 victory against Fulham.

League table

Transfers

In

Loaned in

Out

Loaned out

Completed loans

Squad list
As of 14 February 2012.

Reserves

Match results

Spurs XI

Pre-season

Premier League

League table

Matches
1 Goal originally awarded to Gareth Bale but subsequently ruled a Chris Baird own goal by the Premier League's Dubious Goals Committee.

Results by matchday

FA Cup

1 Fabrice Muamba collapsed after 41 minutes, with the score at 1–1, after which referee Howard Webb abandoned the game. It was later revealed to be a cardiac arrest.

League Cup

Europa League

Play-off round

Tottenham Hotspur win 5–0 on aggregate.

Group stage

Statistics

Appearances

Goal scorers 

The list is sorted by shirt number when total goals are equal.

Clean sheets

The list is sorted by shirt number when total clean sheets are equal.

References

External links
Official Club site
BBC - Tottenham club news

2011–12 Premier League by team
2011-12
Tottenham